María Mercedes Vial Solar (1863–1942), also known as María Mercedes Vial de Ugarte  or by her literary pseudonym Serafia, was a Chilean feminist writer and novelist.

Her parents were Wenceslao Vial y Guznián and Luisa Solar y Marín.

For some authors, her work can be framed within so-called "aristocratic feminism", along with other writers such as Inés Echeverría Bello, Mariana Cox Méndez, Teresa Wilms Montt, María Luisa Fernández, and the sisters Ximena and Carmen Morla Lynch.

Works
 Cosas que fueron (novel, Santiago: Zig-Zag, 1917)
 Amor que no muere (novel, Santiago: Editorial Nascimiento, 1929)
 Algo pasado de moda : conferencias dadas en el Club de Señoras (Santiago: Impr. Cervantes, 1926)

References

1863 births
1942 deaths
20th-century Chilean novelists
Chilean people of French descent
20th-century Chilean women writers
Chilean women novelists
Writers from Santiago
Chilean feminist writers